Peperomia hirta is a species of plant in the genus Peperomia. Its native range is in Central America from Mexico to Panama.

References

hirta
Flora of Central America